Eduardo Fernando Catalano (December 19, 1917 – January 28, 2010) was an Argentine architect.

Life and career
Born in Buenos Aires, Catalano went to the United States on a scholarship to the University of Pennsylvania and Harvard Graduate School of Design. In 1945, after earning his second master's degree in architecture returned to Buenos Aires where he taught at the University of Buenos Aires and ran a private practice. Catalano then taught at the Architectural Association in London from 1950 to 1951, when he came back to the United States as a Professor of Architecture at the School of Design in Raleigh, North Carolina State University. In 1956 he began teaching in the graduate program for MIT, until 1977, when he moved on "to discover and participate in other endeavors as rewarding as teaching".

Catalano had an "understanding of the indivisible relationship between space and structure", which earned him praise from Frank Lloyd Wright, who wrote to House and Home magazine when he saw the publishing of the "Raleigh House" AKA the Catalano House to say "It is refreshing to see that the shelter, which is the most important element in domestic architecture, has been so imaginatively and skillfully treated as in the house by Eduardo Catalano". Catalano sold the house when he moved to Cambridge, Massachusetts to teach at MIT.  Years of neglect at the end of the 20th century culminated in the house's demolition in 2001.

Other buildings designed by Catalano include the US embassies in Buenos Aires, Argentina and in Pretoria, South Africa, the Juilliard School of Music at New York City's Lincoln Center, Guilford County Courthouse in Greensboro, North Carolina, and the Stratton Student Center at MIT in Cambridge, Massachusetts. (Catalano designed the Guilford County-Greensboro Government Center, not to be confused with the Guilford County Courthouse, designed by Harry Barton from 1918 to 1920.)

The Catalano House, built in 1954 and which Catalano is best known for, was designed using a hyperbolic paraboloid roof. Here is a picture of the original House. The roof of the house, a curved structure that is built from straight elements (tongue and groove boarding) evolved from his studies on geometric and structural properties of hyperbolic paraboloids. These studies, which included testing of new materials like aluminum and thin-shell concrete, were published by the University of North Carolina in Structures of Warped Surface.

Eduardo Catalano also created the environmental kinetic sculpture Floralis Genérica in Palermo, Buenos Aires.

Architectural Works

Publications
Gubitosi, Camillo, and Izzo, Alberto, Eduardo Catalano - buildings and projects, Catalogue of the Exhihibition held in Naples, 1978.
Catalano, Eduardo. Structure and Geometry, Cambridge Architectural Press, 1986.
Catalano, Eduardo. the constant - dialogues on architecture in black and white, Cambridge Architectural Press, 2000.

References

External links
The Flower of Buenos Aires – Eduardo Catalano
Guide to the Eduardo Catalano Papers 1940-2017
Guide to the Eduardo Catalano Slides 1954-2002
 (Spanish)
Raleigh (Catalano) House 
Volume 2 of Arquitectos Americanos Contemporáneos

1917 births
2010 deaths
University of Pennsylvania alumni
Harvard Graduate School of Design alumni
Architects from Buenos Aires
Place of birth missing
MIT School of Architecture and Planning faculty